Because They're Young is a 1960 American drama film directed by Paul Wendkos and starring Dick Clark as Neil Hendry, an American high-school teacher who tries to make a difference in the lives of his students. The film co-stars Tuesday Weld, Michael Callan, Warren Berlinger, Roberta Shore, Doug McClure and Victoria Shaw. The screenplay was based on Harrison High, a 1959 novel by John Farris.

Musicians Duane Eddy and James Darren appear in cameo roles, and the film's title song became the biggest hit record of Eddy's career. Bobby Rydell's "Swingin' School" is featured prominently in the film's soundtrack, though Rydell does not appear in the film.

Plot
A crusading high school teacher tries to help his troubled students.

Cast

 Dick Clark – Neil Hendry
 Michael Callan – Griff Rimer
 Tuesday Weld – Ann Gregor
 Victoria Shaw – Joan Dietrich
 Roberta Shore – Ricky Summers
 Warren Berlinger – Buddy McCalla
 Doug McClure – Jim
 Linda Watkins – Frances McCalla
 Chris Robinson – Patcher
 Rudy Bond – Chris
 Wendell Holmes – Principal Donlan
 Philip Coolidge – Mr. Rimer
 Bart Patton – Kramer
 Stephen Talbot – Eric 
 James Darren – Himself
 Shirley Mitchell – Mrs. Summers
 Duane Eddy and the Rebels – Themselves

Production

Original novel
The novel Harrison High was published in 1959 when its author John Farris was 22. He wrote it at the age of 20 while a student at the University of Missouri, and it was based on his high-school experiences in Memphis, though Harrison High is fictional.

The New York Times likened the book to "an interminable adolescent bull session."

Development
Film rights were bought by the Drexel Film Corporation in April 1959, and Drexel arranged to make the film through Columbia. Dick Clark, host of American Bandstand, signed to play the lead.

Jerry Bresler, who had a multi-picture deal with Columbia, was assigned to produce and he hired James Gunn to write a script. Paul Wendkos signed to direct in June.

"Most pictures about teenagers are wrong," said Clark, "They are older people's concepts of how teenagers act... I doubt if there ever can be a truly honest portrayal in films.  Not all girls are beautiful and all boys handsome, as they are in films... [But] the script is fairly true to life. Most teenagers are normal."

The cast included several young actors under contract to Columbia, including Michael Callan. Warren Berlinger, who played Buddy McCalla, had just recently appeared in Blue Denim.

Shooting
Filming started on August 12, 1959. The campus and classroom scenes were shot at Hoover High School in Glendale, California.

Clark later wrote in his memoirs that making the film was "an extraordinary experience. Columbia really laid it on; they rented a house in Bel-Air owned by Mercedes McCambridge, provided a maid, a butler and a chauffeur, and gave me a hundred dollars a day in expenses."

Reception
The Los Angeles Times called the film "an agreeable surprise."

The film did not make Variety's list of top earners for 1960.

References

External links
 

Because They're Young at BFI

1960 films
1960s coming-of-age drama films
1960s teen drama films
American black-and-white films
American coming-of-age drama films
American teen drama films
American high school films
Columbia Pictures films
1960s English-language films
Films scored by John Williams
Films about educators
Films based on American novels
Films directed by Paul Wendkos
Films shot in California
1960s American films